The 2017 Bommarito Automotive Group 500 was the 15th round of the 2017 IndyCar Series season. The race was held on August 26, 2017 at Gateway Motorsports Park in Madison, Illinois, just east of St. Louis, Missouri. Will Power qualified on pole for the race, while Josef Newgarden won the race after gaining the lead on lap 217.

Background
On August 25, 2016, the IndyCar Series announced a multi-year deal with Gateway Motorsports Park—with the inaugural race scheduled for August 26, 2017. IndyCar's return to Gateway Motorsports Park marked the first premier-level open-wheel race in the Greater St. Louis area since 2003.

In July 2017, the entire racetrack was resurfaced as part of an effort by the track to update and upgrade the venue. Both IndyCar and NASCAR supported the repaving project. Other major upgrades to the venue included new catch fences, paving part of the inside track, and expanding the SAFER barrier.

The race saw the return of Sébastien Bourdais, who had not raced since fracturing his hip and pelvis in a violent crash during Indianapolis 500 qualifying.

Qualifying
Qualifying was held on Friday, August 25. Will Power qualified on pole position with a two lap time of 47.4579 (189.642).

Race
The newly repaved track surface, which had impressed drivers during testing, quickly became a source of concern after multiple incidents at the beginning of the race. Tony Kanaan's car spun on the pace lap and made contact with the SAFER barrier in turn 2. Kanaan was eventually able to re-enter the race three laps down, though his crash delayed the start of the race until lap 5. When the remaining field took the green flag, polesitter Will Power spun on the first green-flag lap of the race. The spin caused Power's car to hit the wall in turn 2. As Takuma Sato and Ed Carpenter attempted to avoid Power, the two cars made contact with each other. Both drivers subsequently contacted the wall, causing all three drivers to retire from the race.

Josef Newgarden passed Will Power for the lead on the outside of turn 1 immediately prior to Power's spin-out. Newgarden maintained the lead until pitting on lap 60. Sébastien Bourdais then led the race for the next 5 laps until he was forced to pit as well. Max Chilton became the race leader for a single lap before also making a pit stop. As both Bourdais and Chilton were on alternate pit strategies, Newgarden remained the effective leader of the race.

After Chilton's pit stop on lap 66, Newgarden officially regained the lead on lap 67. The third caution of the race came out when J. R. Hildebrand crashed into turn 4 on lap 102. During the caution period, all of the race leaders pitted. Hélio Castroneves beat Newgarden out of pit road to take the race lead.

The green flag came back out on lap 112. By lap 155, Castroneves had extended his lead to just over three seconds ahead of Newgarden. During a pit stop on lap 157, Castroneves stalled while exiting his pit box. Although his crew was able to restart his car almost immediately, the long stop dropped Castroneves from leading the race to fourth place. The incident also gave the race lead back to Newgarden.

The fourth caution occurred on lap 166 when Max Chilton spun into the outside wall of turn 4. During the caution, Chilton's teammate Tony Kanaan was called to the pit lane by team owner Chip Ganassi. Kanaan's car had been loose throughout the race, prompting Ganassi to park Kanaan's car for the remainder of the race. The decision was reminiscent of one from the previous race at Pocono, in which Ganassi parked Chilton's car.

The race returned to green flag conditions on lap 174. A notable incident occurred on lap 181 between Conor Daly and Charlie Kimball. Daly, running in eleventh place at the time, got a run on Kimball. As Daly began to pass Kimball on the inside of the track, Kimball abruptly swerved to his left. Daly was furious, as it appeared that Kimballs move was a clear attempt to block him. The incident was reviewed, but no action was taken against Kimball.

The fifth and final caution arose on lap 203 when Ryan Hunter-Reay entered turn 4 too high and brushed the SAFER barrier as he exited the turn. Simon Pagenaud gained the race lead over Josef Newgarden on lap 206 when both drivers made pit stops under caution.

Newgarden regained the lead on lap 217 after passing Pagenaud on the inside as the two entered turn 1. During the pass, the two cars' tires made slight contact, sending Pagenaud to the outside of the track. Although a crash was avoided, Pagenaud was forced to lift off the gas to avoid hitting the outside wall. Scott Dixon, who had been running in third, seized the opportunity and passed Pagenaud as well.

Shortly after retaking the lead, Newgarden pulled more than a second ahead of Dixon. Pagenaud held his position roughly a half-second behind Dixon. Newgarden held his position for the remainder of the race, clinching his fourth win of the season.

Results

Qualifying

Source for individual laps:

Race

Notes
 Points include 1 point for leading at least 1 lap during a race, an additional 2 points for leading the most race laps, and 1 point for Pole Position.

Source for time gaps:

Championship standings

Driver standings

Manufacturer standings

 Note: Only the top-five drivers in the standings are included.

References

External links
 Gateway Motorsports Park website
 2017 Gateway Indy 250 IndyCar Page
 2017 Gateway Indy 250 on YouTube

Bommarito Automotive Group 500
Bommarito Automotive Group 500
Bommarito Automotive Group 500